Tony Alvarez, known as DJ Tony A. Da Wizard (TT Wizard") is an American DJ/producer and film director. He is best known for creating The Roadium Mixtapes with Dr. Dre and Steve Yano at the Roadium Swap Meet in Gardena, California. He’s also known for producing and DJing for the rapper Hi-C featuring Tony A. on the album titled Skanless.

Early career 

At the age of 11, Tony first experienced what a DJ was when he went with his Brother Mario Alvarez to Noah's Ark (also known as Infinity and Grand Central Station) nightclub in the east side Long Beach. From that day forward he wanted to become a DJ. Shortly after he began working for Steve and Susan Yano at the Vermont Swap Meet in Gardena, California selling vinyl records and cassettes. He started DJing at his Junior High School noon dances and then went on to DJ house parties, birthday parties, quinceañera's etc. In 1988, Tony A. won 1st place at Battle of The DJs at Samerika Hall in Carson, California. In 1987, Tony A. was featured on his first vinyl record single titled "You Better Think" by rapper Dazzie Dee, Produced by Sir Jinx on Thin-Lyne Records, the record label of the World-famous VIP in Long Beach, California.

Collaborations 
Tony A. has worked with many artists in the film and music industries including The Hughes Brothers, Dr. Dre, Eazy-E, Ice Cube, MC Ren, DJ Quik, Young MC, Tone Loc, JJ Fad, Sir Jinx (Lench Mob), Hi-C, 2nd II None, AMG, B-Real (Cypress Hill), Sen Dog (Cypress Hill), Mellow Man Ace, Teena Marie, Krazy Dee (N.W.A.), Lawless, Lil Rob, Kid Frost, Foesum, Slow Pain (G'Fellas), Nino Brown (G'Fellas), Dazzie Dee and more. Tony A. and Hi-C were the first rap group signed to Disney / Hollywood Records.

Roadium 

In the early 1980s, Yano employed Dr. Dre of the World Class Wreckin' Cru to create mixtapes for him to sell at his booth at the Roadium Swap Meet. Dr. Dre created the mixes and some of the rappers featured on them were MC Ren, Ice Cube, Eazy-E, Krazy Dee (N.W.A.), Sir Jinx, Dazzie Dee and more. In 1987, while Dr. Dre was producing various artists on Ruthless Records, he asked Tony A. if he wanted to take over doing the mixtapes for Steve. Soon after, Tony A. began creating the mixtapes. His first mixtape that was released was titled "Breakdown". In 1991, Tony A. released his final mixtape titled "Bullshit" which featured Hi-C, DJ Quik, 2nd II None and AMG. During his mixtape career, he created 30+ mixtapes.

Hi-C Featuring Tony A. 
In 1989, Tony A. created and produced his very first song titled "I'm Not Your Puppet" on the mixtape titled Hi-C which featured the Compton, California Rapper Hi-C, who worked at the Roadium Swap Meet. After the success of the Hi-C mixtape, Tony A. created and produced "Sitting In The Park" on the mixtape titled Skanlist, which also featured Hi-C. These mixtapes led Disney (Hollywood Records) in 1990 to approach Steve Yano with interest in signing the duo. After they signed, Steve Yano established his own label called "Skanless Records". They began recording their debut album titled Hi-C Featuring Tony A. at Audio Achievements in Torrance, California. There they recorded half of their album and eventually finished at Skanless Studios in Alhambra, California. This album was released December 10, 1991. The album peaked at 152 on the Billboard 200, at number 21 on the Hot Rap Songs for the song titled "Sitting In The Park", at number 53 on the Top R&B/Hip Hop Albums, at number 3 on the Heatseekers Albums for 24 weeks. In 1993, Tony A. produced half of the Hi-C album titled Swing'n.

The Roadium Mixtape Documixery 
In May 2017, Tony A. along with John Elkins (JE Visual Studios), Daniel "DG" Jones (DG Media Clips), Carey Fujita (South Bay Drones), Roger "Lyve" Mera (RL Productions), Boomerdidit (The Remedy Yard) and Wiz1 (Blak Forest) started production of The Roadium Mixtape Documixery in memory of Steve Yano. Production was completed in December 2018. It was set to release in 2019. It is a docu-series that focuses on the history of Steve Yano, Dr. Dre, Tony A. and The Roadium Mixtapes. The cast includes  Tony A., Warren G, Mister Cartoon, Violet Brown, 2nd II None, AMG, Hi-C, DJ Speed (N.W.A), Sir Jinx, Kelvin Anderson (VIP Records), Ernie G (Proper Dos/Skanless Records), Big Citric (Brown Town Looters/George Lopez Show), DJ Jam, Alonso "Lonzo" Williams (World Class Wreckin' Cru), Cli-N-Tel (World Class Wreckin' Cru), Kid Frost, Mellow Man Ace, DJ Rhettmatic (The World-famous Beat Junkies), Break Beat Lou (Ultimate Breaks & Beats), DJ Thoro, DJ Money B, Greedy Greg and Arabian Prince (N.W.A).

Present day 
Tony A. is currently focused on directing films (Tony Vision) while DJing and producing music. He established Tony Vision in 2019.

Charts

References

External links 
 

1968 births
Living people
Date of birth missing (living people)
American DJs
American film producers